Jung Seung-Yong is a South Korean football wing back who plays for Gangwon FC.

External links
 

1991 births
Living people
Association football forwards
South Korean footballers
South Korea international footballers
FC Seoul players
Gyeongnam FC players
Gangwon FC players
K League 1 players
K League 2 players
Sportspeople from Busan